Cop Hater is a 1958 American crime film noir police procedural film, based on the 1956 novel Cop Hater by Ed McBain, the first in a series of books about the 87th Precinct in New York City.  The film was produced and directed by William Berke, written by Henry Kane, and stars Robert Loggia and Gerald O'Loughlin.

Plot
During an intense summer heat wave in New York City, two cops are murdered and it's up to the detectives of the 87th Precinct to find the killer.  Steve Carella (Robert Loggia) and Mike Maguire (Gerald O'Loughlin) are the lead investigators on the case, but they can't seem to make any progress, and their work is made more difficult by a reporter, Hank Miller (Gene Miller), who keeps sticking his nose in.  The two cops try to keep their personal lives separate from their work, but it keeps bleeding through.  When Maguire is shot and killed, Carella has to comfort his partner's sexpot wife Alice (Shirley Ballard), and then goes on a bender with the reporter, inadvertently revealing his suspicions about the case, and putting his girlfriend Teddy, a deaf-mute author (Ellen Parker), in jeopardy.  When a hood (Hal Riddle) shows up at her apartment, Carella overpowers him and forces a confession: he killed all the cops, but Maguire had been the intended victim all along, as his wife wanted him out of the way.

Cast
 Robert Loggia as Detective Carelli
 Gerald O'Loughlin as Detective Maguire
 Ellen Parker as Carelli's Girl - - Teddy
 Shirley Ballard as Maguire's Wife - - Alice
 Russell Hardie as Detective Lt. Byrnes
 Hal Riddle as Cop Hater - - Killer
 William Neff as Rookie Cop - - Kling
 Gene Miller as Reporter Miller
 Vince Gardenia as Danny the Gimp
 John Gerstad as Laboratory Technician
 Ralph Stantley as Detective Willis
 Glen Gannon as Gang Leader - - Rip
 Alan Manson as Newlywed Clark
 Sandra Stevens as Newlywed Wife
 Jan Kalionzes as Officer Reardon's Wife
 Jerry Orbach as Gang Leader - - Mumzer
 Frank Dana as Young Hoodlum
 Ted Gunther as Detective Haviland
 Lincoln Kilpatrick as Detective Foster
 Miriam Goldina as Mama Lucy
 Thomas Nello as Ex-Con Ortiz
 Kate Harkin as Ortiz's Wife
 Alan Bergnan as Police Officer Reardon
 Lulu King as Detective Foster's Mother
 Terry Green as Boy In Lineup
 Steve Franken as Boy In Lineup

Cast notes:
The opening credits list 25 cast names and the closing credits list 27 cast names. The first nine cast names are in the same order in both opening and closing. All the remaining cast names are in a different order.
Johnny Seven is billed as "John Seven" in the opening credits and as "Johnny Seven" in the closing credits.
Kate Harkin is billed as "Kathryn Harkin" in the opening credits and as "Kate Harkin" in the closing credits.

References

External links
 
 
 

1958 films
Film noir
1958 crime films
American crime films
American black-and-white films
1950s English-language films
Films directed by William A. Berke
Films scored by Albert Glasser
Films set in New York City
Films shot in New York City
American police detective films
United Artists films
1950s police procedural films
Films based on novels by Ed McBain
1950s American films